Yuichi Sugita was the defending champion after defeating Matthew Ebden in the 2010 final. He was eliminated by Cedrik-Marcel Stebe already in the first round.
Stebe reached the final, but lost to Dominik Meffert 6–4, 4–6, 2–6.

Seeds

Draw

Finals

Top half

Bottom half

References
 Main Draw
 Qualifying Draw

All Japan Indoor Tennis Championships - Singles
2011 Singles